The 2015 Basingstoke and Deane Borough Council election took place on 7 May 2015 to elect members of Basingstoke and Deane Borough Council in England. It was held on the same day as the 2015 general election as well as other local elections.

21 seats were up for election. The seat in Rooksdown was up for election due to a casual vacancy, and its winner would serve a term lasting until 2016.

The Conservatives gained four seats and gained a 4-seat majority on the council. They gained one seat from Labour in Brighton Hill North and two from independents in Chineham and Tadley Central. Both the defeated independent candidates were seeking re-election; the former was a long-serving independent, while the latter had been elected as a Conservative in 2011 before defecting to UKIP, then becoming independent. Labour gained the rural ward of Overton, Laverstoke and Steventon from the Liberal Democrats.

Results

Results by Ward

Basing

Baughurst and Tadley North

Bramley and Sherfield

Brighton Hill North

Burghclere, Highclere and St Mary Bourne

Chineham

Eastrop

Grove

Hatch Warren and Beggarwood

Kempshott

Kingsclere

Norden

Oakley and North Waltham

Overton, Laverstoke and Steventon

Pamber and Silchester

Rooksdown

South Ham

Tadley Central

Tadley South

Upton Grey and The Candovers

Winklebury

References

2015 English local elections
May 2015 events in the United Kingdom
2015
2010s in Hampshire